Lookphorkhun Football Club (Thai ลูกพ่อขุน ยูไนเต็ด) is a Thai new semi professional football. They currently play in Regional League Division 2 Bangkok & field Region in 2016. They currently play in Regional League Division 2 Bangkok region from Derby match province project.

Season By Season Record

External links

Association football clubs established in 2016
Football clubs in Bangkok
2016 establishments in Thailand